Cirrhilabrus, the fairy wrasses, is a genus of fish in the family Labridae native to coral reefs and nearby habitats in the Indo-Pacific region. They are brightly colored and do not surpass  in length. Males are larger and more colorful than females. They are commonly kept in aquaria.

Species
There are currently more than 60 recognized species in this genus:

 Cirrhilabrus adornatus J. E. Randall & Kunzmann, 1998 (Red-fin fairy-wrasse)
 Cirrhilabrus africanus Victor, 2016 (African long-fin fairy-wrasse)
 Cirrhilabrus aquamarinus Tea, G. R. Allen & Dailami, 2021
 Cirrhilabrus aurantidorsalis G. R. Allen & Kuiter, 1999 (Orangeback fairy-wrasse)
 Cirrhilabrus balteatus J. E. Randall, 1988 (Girdled fairy-wrasse)
 Cirrhilabrus bathyphilus J. E. Randall & Nagareda, 2002 (Deep-water fairy-wrasse)
 Cirrhilabrus beauperryi G. R. Allen, Drew & Barber, 2008 (Beau's fairy-wrasse)
 Cirrhilabrus blatteus V. G. Springer & J. E. Randall, 1974 (Purple-boned fairy-wrasse)
Cirrhilabrus briangreenei 
 Cirrhilabrus brunneus G. R. Allen, 2006 (Dusky fairy-wrasse)
 Cirrhilabrus cenderawasih G. R. Allen & Erdmann, 2006 (Cenderawasih fairy-wrasse)
 Cirrhilabrus chaliasi Tea, G. R. Allen & Dailami, 2021
 Cirrhilabrus claire J. E. Randall & Pyle, 2001 (Claire's fairy-wrasse)
 Cirrhilabrus condei G. R. Allen & J. E. Randall, 1996 (Conde's fairy-wrasse)
Cirrhilabrus cyanogularis Y.K. Tea, B.W. Frable, & A. Gill, 2018 (Blue-throated fairy-wrasse)
 Cirrhilabrus cyanopleura (Bleeker, 1851) (Blueside wrasse)
 Cirrhilabrus earlei J. E. Randall & Pyle, 2001 (Orange-striped fairy-wrasse)
 Cirrhilabrus efatensis F. Walsh, Tea & Tanaka, 2017 (hooded fairy-wrasse)
 Cirrhilabrus exquisitus J. L. B. Smith, 1957 (Exquisite fairy-wrasse)
 Cirrhilabrus filamentosus (Klausewitz, 1976) (Whip-fin fairy-wrasse)
 Cirrhilabrus finifenmaa (Y. K. Tea, Nejeeb, Rowlett & Rocha, 2022) (Rose-veiled fairy wrasse)
 Cirrhilabrus flavidorsalis J. E. Randall & K. E. Carpenter, 1980 (Yellow-fin fairy-wrasse)
 Cirrhilabrus humanni G. R. Allen & Erdmann, 2012 (Humann's fairy-wrasse)
 Cirrhilabrus hygroxerus G. R. Allen & M. P. Hammer, 2016 (Monsoon fairy-wrasse)
 Cirrhilabrus isosceles Y. K. Tea, Senou & Greene, 2016 (Pin-tail fairy-wrasse)
 Cirrhilabrus joanallenae G. R. Allen, 2000 (Joan's fairy-wrasse)
 Cirrhilabrus johnsoni J. E. Randall, 1988 (Johnson's fairy-wrasse)
 Cirrhilabrus jordani Snyder, 1904 (Flame fairy-wrasse)
 Cirrhilabrus katherinae J. E. Randall, 1992 (Katherine's fairy-wrasse)
 Cirrhilabrus katoi Senou & Hirata, 2000
 Cirrhilabrus laboutei J. E. Randall & Lubbock, 1982 (Laboute's fairy-wrasse)
 Cirrhilabrus lanceolatus J. E. Randall & H. Masuda, 1991 (Long-tailed fairy-wrasse)
 Cirrhilabrus lineatus J. E. Randall & Lubbock, 1982 (Purple-lined fairy-wrasse)
 Cirrhilabrus lubbocki J. E. Randall & K. E. Carpenter, 1980 (Lubbock's fairy-wrasse)
 Cirrhilabrus lunatus J. E. Randall & H. Masuda, 1991
 Cirrhilabrus luteovittatus J. E. Randall, 1988 (Yellow-band fairy-wrasse)
 Cirrhilabrus marinda G. R. Allen, Erdmann & Dailami, 2015 (Sail-fin fairy-wrasse)
 Cirrhilabrus marjorie G. R. Allen, J. E. Randall & B. A. Carlson, 2003 (Marjorie's fairy-wrasse)
 Cirrhilabrus melanomarginatus J. E. Randall & S. C. Shen, 1978 (Black-fin fairy-wrasse)
 Cirrhilabrus morrisoni G. R. Allen, 1999 (Morrison's fairy-wrasse)
 Cirrhilabrus nahackyi F. M. Walsh & H. Tanaka, 2012 (Nahacky's fairy-wrasse)
 Cirrhilabrus naokoae J. E. Randall & H. Tanaka, 2009 (Naoko's fairy-wrasse)
 Cirrhilabrus punctatus J. E. Randall & Kuiter, 1989 (Dotted fairy-wrasse)
 Cirrhilabrus pylei G. R. Allen & J. E. Randall, 1996 (Pyle's fairy-wrasse)
 Cirrhilabrus randalli G. R. Allen, 1995 (Randall's fairy-wrasse)
 Cirrhilabrus rhomboidalis J. E. Randall, 1988 (Rhomboid fairy-wrasse)
 Cirrhilabrus roseafascia J. E. Randall & Lubbock, 1982 (Pink-banded fairy-wrasse)
 Cirrhilabrus rubeus Victor, 2016 (Ruby long-fin fairy-wrasse)
 Cirrhilabrus rubrimarginatus J. E. Randall, 1992 (Red-margined fairy-wrasse)
 Cirrhilabrus rubripinnis J. E. Randall & K. E. Carpenter, 1980 (Redfin wrasse)
 Cirrhilabrus rubrisquamis J. E. Randall & Emery, 1983 (Rosy-scales fairy-wrasse)
 Cirrhilabrus rubriventralis V. G. Springer & J. E. Randall, 1974 (Long-fin fairy-wrasse)
 Cirrhilabrus ryukyuensis Ishikawa, 1904 
 Cirrhilabrus sanguineus Cornic, 1987 (Red-blotched fairy-wrasse)
 Cirrhilabrus scottorum J. E. Randall & R. M. Pyle, 1989 (Scott's fairy-wrasse)
 Cirrhilabrus shutmani Y.K. Tea & Gill, 2017 (Magma fairy-wrasse)
 Cirrhilabrus solorensis Bleeker 1853 (Red-eye fairy-wrasse)
 Cirrhilabrus squirei F. M. Walsh, 2014 (Squire's fairy-wrasse)
 Cirrhilabrus temminckii Bleeker, 1853 (Thread-fin fairy-wrasse)
 Cirrhilabrus tonozukai G. R. Allen & Kuiter, 1999 (Tono's fairy-wrasse)
 Cirrhilabrus wakanda  Tea, Pinheiro, Shepherd & Rocha, 2019 (Vibranium fairy wrasse)
 Cirrhilabrus walindi G. R. Allen & J. E. Randall, 1996 (Walindi fairy-wrasse)
 Cirrhilabrus walshi J. E. Randall & Pyle, 2001

References

 
Labridae
Marine fish genera
Taxa named by Coenraad Jacob Temminck
Taxa named by Hermann Schlegel